Jeans is a lunar impact crater, on the southeastern limb of the Moon, with its majority lying on the far side. A favorable libration can bring the entire crater into view, but even then the details observable from Earth are very limited as the crater is viewed rather "edge-on".

Jeans is located nearly midway between the much larger walled plain Lyot on the near side and the crater Chamberlin on the far side. It has a heavily worn and rounded outer rim, and several impacts lie along the southern and southeastern edge and inner wall. The most prominent of these intersecting craters are Jeans G across the eastern rim. The interior floor of the main crater has been resurfaced by basaltic lava, leaving a dark level surface marked only by a few tiny craterlets.

Satellite craters 

By convention these features are identified on lunar maps by placing the letter on the side of the crater midpoint that is closest to Jeans.

References 

 
 
 
 
 
 
 
 
 
 
 
 

Impact craters on the Moon